Edward Joseph Gilbert (born December 26, 1936) is a 20th- and 21st-century American-born bishop of the Catholic Church in the Antilles. He served as bishop of the Diocese of Roseau in Dominica, from 1994-2001. He was the Archbishop of Port of Spain, Trinidad and Tobago between 2001-2011.

Biography

Early life and ministry
Gilbert was born in Brooklyn, New York, on December 26, 1936. He professed religious vows in the Congregation of the Most Holy Redeemer (Redemptorists) on August 2, 1959. He studied for the priesthood at St Mary's College Seminary, North East, Pennsylvania and Mount St. Alphonsus Seminary in Esopus, New York. 

He was ordained a priest on June 21, 1964. He earned a Doctor of Canon Law degree from The Catholic University of America in Washington, D.C. From 1968-69 he was involved in parish ministry in Brooklyn. He was assigned to the faculty at Mount St. Alphonsus Seminary from 1970-1984. He served as professor of Canon Law for 14 years, academic dean for six years and the seminary rector for six years. In 1984, he was elected the Provincial Superior of the Baltimore Province, a position he held until he was named bishop.

Bishop of Roseau
On July 1, 1994 John Paul II named him the eighth bishop of the Diocese of Roseau. He was consecrated by Archbishop Kelvin Edward Felix of Castries on September 7, 1994. The principal co-consecrators were Bishops Ronald Gerard Connors, C.Ss.R. of San Juan de la Maguana and Pastor Cuquejo, C.Ss.R. of the Military Ordinariate of Paraguay.   During his six years in Roseau Bishop Gilbert worked to reorganize the diocese. He inaugurated the Diocesan Synod, which involved the clergy, religious and laity in all its aspects. All areas of church life were studied and four areas were selected for on-going pastoral care: family life, youth, training and finances. Gilbert promoted vocations to the priesthood and religious life. He modernized church structures, which included the appointment of the first woman to be the chancellor of the diocese. He also created the Dominica Catholic, a quarterly diocesan newspaper.

Archbishop of Port of Spain
John Paul II named Bishop Gilbert the 11th archbishop of Port of Spain on March 21, 2001. He was installed in Port of Spain on May 5, 2001. Archbishop Gilbert served the archdiocese for eleven years until his resignation was accepted by Pope Benedict XVI on December 26, 2011.

References

1936 births
Living people
Mount St. Alphonsus Seminary alumni
Redemptorist bishops
American expatriates in Dominica
American expatriates in Trinidad and Tobago
20th-century Roman Catholic bishops in Dominica
Trinidad and Tobago Roman Catholic archbishops
Roman Catholic bishops of the Antilles
21st-century Roman Catholic archbishops in the Caribbean
People from Brooklyn
Catholic University of America alumni
Roman Catholic bishops of Roseau
Roman Catholic archbishops of Port of Spain
20th-century American Roman Catholic priests
21st-century American Roman Catholic priests